The California State Board of Equalization (BOE) is a public agency charged with tax administration and fee collection in the state of California in the United States. The authorities of the Board fall into four broad areas: sales and use taxes; property taxes; special taxes; and acting as an appellate body for franchise and income tax appeals (these taxes are collected by the Franchise Tax Board). 

The BOE is the only publicly elected tax commission in the United States. It is made up of four directly elected members, each representing a district for four-year terms, along with the State Controller, who is elected on a statewide basis, serving as the fifth member. In June 2017, Governor Jerry Brown signed legislation stripping the Board of many of its powers, returning the agency to its original core responsibilities (originating in the State Constitution in 1879).

History
The State Board of Equalization was created in 1879 by the ratification of the second Constitution of California. Its original mandate was to ensure that property tax assessments were uniform and equal across all counties in the state.

Prior to the creation of the state income tax, sales tax, and fuel taxes in the 1930s, California's state government was almost completely supported by property taxes, which were and still are assessed at the county level by elected tax assessors.  Assessors were tempted to boost their popularity with county voters by undervaluing voters' property (and thereby lowering their taxes).  This presented the risk of counties with honest assessors paying more than their fair share of the burden of operating the state government, so the Board of Equalization was created to equalize the burden.

The California Franchise Tax Board and the Employment Development Department are separately also responsible for collecting taxes. Some have criticized this as inefficient.  Efforts to reform the Board were made in the 1940s, 1950s, 1960s, 1990s, and 2000s.

In 1994, Governor Pete Wilson vetoed a plan by the legislature to abolish the Franchise Tax Board and give its responsibilities to the Board of Equalization, explaining in his veto message that the state should have done the opposite. In 2004, Governor Arnold Schwarzenegger released a 2,500-page report seeking to merge the Board with other agencies and then promoted a bill by Assemblywoman Lois Wolk to do just that. The effort failed. In 2008, the agency employed approximately 3,950 people throughout the state.

By 2017, the Board had expanded to collecting $60 billion a year. It collected sales and use taxes, hazardous waste fees, jet fuel taxes, marijuana taxes, and over 30 additional taxes. That year, the Board had 4,700 employees and a $617 million annual budget. Board members are paid a $137,000 annual salary and are each allowed to hire a 12-member staff. Each year, the Board spends at least $3 million on education events where elected members appear before their constituents.

In March 2017, an audit by the California Department of Finance revealed missing funds and signs of nepotism, leading to calls for the governor to put the Board under a public trustee.  In June 2017, the California Department of Justice began a criminal investigation into the members of the Board.

On June 27, 2017, Governor Jerry Brown signed into law legislation stripping the Board of many of its powers.  The legislation created two new departments controlled by the governor responsible for the Board’s statutory duties, the California Department of Tax and Fee Administration and the California Office of Tax Appeals.

The Board still has its constitutional powers to review property tax assessments and insurer tax assessments, and its role in the collection of alcohol excise and pipeline taxes.  It retained 400 employees, with the rest of its 4,800 workers being shifted to the new departments.

Equalization districts

For the purposes of tax administration, the BOE divides the state into four Equalization districts, each with its own elected board member. District boundaries are redrawn following the decennial census. The latest boundaries were drawn following the 2010 census and have been in effect since January 1, 2015.

First district
The First Equalization District is made up of the following counties: Alpine, Amador, Butte, Calaveras, El Dorado, Fresno, Inyo, Kern, Kings, Lassen, Madera, Mariposa, Merced, Modoc, Mono, Nevada, Placer, Plumas, Sacramento, San Joaquin, Shasta, Sierra, Siskiyou, Stanislaus, Sutter, Tulare, Tuolumne and Yuba; a portion of Los Angeles County including the cities of Azusa, Bradbury, Claremont, Duarte, Irwindale, La Verne, Lancaster, Palmdale, Pomona, San Dimas, San Fernando and Santa Clarita; and most of San Bernardino County, the portion not included in the Third and Fourth districts. From 2003 until 2015 most of this area was the Second District.

Second district
The Second Equalization District is made up of the following counties: Alameda, Colusa, Contra Costa, Del Norte, Glenn, Humboldt, Lake, Marin, Mendocino, Monterey, Napa, San Benito, San Francisco, San Luis Obispo, San Mateo, Santa Barbara, Santa Clara, Santa Cruz, Solano, Sonoma, Tehama, Trinity and Yolo. From 2003 until 2015 most of this area was the First District.

Third district
The Third Equalization District is made up of Ventura County; most of Los Angeles County, the portion not included in the First District; and the city of Chino Hills in San Bernardino County. From 2003 until 2015 most of this area was the Fourth District.

Fourth district
The Fourth Equalization District is made up of the following counties: Imperial, Orange, Riverside and San Diego; and a portion of San Bernardino County including the cities of Colton, Fontana, Grand Terrace, Highland, Loma Linda, Redlands, Rialto, San Bernardino, Twentynine Palms, Yucaipa and Yucca Valley. From 2003 until 2015 most of this area was the Third District.

Members of the Board of Equalization

Current members

List of members

Programs
After being reduced to its constitutional responsibilities in 2017, the Board retained almost none of its tax and fee responsibilities. The only property taxes it actively administers in its entirety are state-assessed properties and the Private Railroad Car Tax; the Board acts only in an appellate role in collecting the Alcoholic Beverage Tax and Insurance Tax, reviewing appeals of denials of claims for refund.

However, the Board does continue to appraise and audit public utilities, railroad companies and properties owned by counties outside of their own jurisdictions, known as 'state-assessed properties', and hear appeals from its own staff appraisals.

Tax administration programs
 State-assessed properties
 Private Railroad Car Tax

Regulatory programs
 County-assessed properties

Appellate-only programs
 Alcoholic Beverage Tax
 Tax on Insurers

See also

Districts in California

References

External links
 Board of Equalization

Board of Equalization
Taxation in California
US state tax agencies
Government agencies established in 1879